Arthur Gould (31 January 1892 – 24 February 1948) was a British wrestler. He competed in the lightweight event at the 1912 Summer Olympics.

References

External links
 

1892 births
1948 deaths
Olympic wrestlers of Great Britain
Wrestlers at the 1912 Summer Olympics
British male sport wrestlers
Sportspeople from London